The Brazos Wind Farm, also known as the Green Mountain Energy Wind Farm at Brazos, is located in Borden and Scurry counties in Texas. It has 160 wind turbines, each rated at one megawatt (MW) and supplied by Mitsubishi, and was completed in December 2003. The wind farm sells generated power on a long-term basis to a local power distributor, TXU Energy, to supply approximately 30,000 homes in Texas. 50% of the Brazos Wind Farm is owned by Shell Wind Energy, Inc.

See also

Green Mountain Energy
Fluvanna, Texas
Double Mountain Fork Brazos River
Roscoe Wind Farm
South Plains Wind Farm

References

External links

Energy infrastructure completed in 2003
Buildings and structures in Borden County, Texas
Buildings and structures in Scurry County, Texas
Wind farms in Texas